The 1922 Grand National was the 81st renewal of the world-famous Grand National horse race that took place at Aintree Racecourse near Liverpool, England, on 24 March 1922.

After two false starts, the race was won by Music Hall at odds of 100/9. The nine-year-old was ridden by Lewis Rees and trained by Owen Anthony, for owner Hugh Kershaw, who collected the winner's prize of £5,000. The winning jockey's brother, Fred Rees, had won the race the previous year on Shaun Spadah.

Drifter finished in second place and Taffytus in third. Sergeant Murphy and A Double Escape were remounted after falling and finished fourth and fifth respectively. There were only five finishers from the field of thirty-two horses. Most did not complete the first circuit, with many having been obstructed by Sergeant Murphy in an incident at the Canal Turn.

After a second consecutive year with a small number of finishers, following the 1921 race when only four horses completed the course, The Manchester Guardian wrote that "it is often not a case of the survival of the fittest but of the survival of the luckiest", while Robin Goodfellow in the Daily Mail described it as "a fit subject for the Chamber of Horrors". The favourite, Southampton, and Shaun Spadah both fell at the first fence, and there were two equine fatalities: The Inca II at Becher's Brook and Awbeg at the Canal Turn.

Finishing Order

Non-finishers

References

 1922
Grand National
Grand National
20th century in Lancashire
Grand National